Bucharest, the capital of Romania, is the site of 100 completed high-rises, 6 of which stand taller than  and 58 of which stand taller than . The tallest skyscraper in the city and Romania is the SkyTower, which rises  in Sector 1. The city has been the site of several construction projects that mostly consist of new office buildings, residential towers and hotel developments.

Bucharest's history of high-rises began with the 1932 completion of the 14-story Carlton Bloc. Telephone Palace was completed in 1934. Bucharest underwent a major building boom during the communist regime which led to many systematization works. During this time, the House of the Free Press became the tallest building in the city; the  structure was also the tallest building in Romania until 2007, when the Tower Center International was completed. The most recent high-rise construction project to be completed in Bucharest was the Ana Tower. The project consisted of a 25-story, office building. The building, located on the Bulevardul Poligrafiei was completed in 2019, becoming the 3rd-tallest building in the city.

The largest construction projects in the city are the Orhideea Towers, The Bridge and the Globalworth Campus. The project is expected to be delivered by 2017. The Bridge is another large project consisting of two 10 floor office buildings located next to the Orhideea towers. 
The largest and most important project in construction is the Globalworth Campus consisting of three office buildings, two of which have 12 floors and one 14 floors. The  complex will be at completion, in 2017, the largest office building complex in Bucharest and Romania surpassing the   Iride Business Park owned by Immofinanz. The original project of the Globalworth Campus included a fourth 25 floor building which was not included in the development.

Tallest buildings

List of tallest buildings in Bucharest (black buildings are completed, gray ones are proposed or under construction)
This includes spires and architectural details but does not include antenna masts.

Tallest under construction, proposed, and approved

Under construction
This lists buildings that are under construction in Bucharest and are planned to rise at least . A floor count of 15 storys is used as the cutoff for buildings whose heights have not yet been released by their developers.

Approved
This lists buildings that are approved in Bucharest and are planned to rise at least . A floor count of 15 storys is used as the cutoff for buildings whose heights have not yet been released by their developers.

Proposed
This lists buildings that are proposed in Bucharest and are planned to rise at least . A floor count of 15 storys is used as the cutoff for buildings whose heights have not yet been released by their developers.

* Table entries without text indicate that information regarding building heights has not yet been released.

Timeline of tallest buildings
This lists buildings that once held the title of tallest building in Bucharest. The Turnul Colţei was the tallest structure in Bucharest from 1714 until 1888; because the bell tower was not a habitable building, it never stood as the tallest building in the city, but is included in this table for comparative purposes.

See also
 List of tallest buildings in Romania
 List of tallest structures in Romania

Notes
 A.  Because the Turnul Colţei was not a habitable building, it never held the title of tallest building in Bucharest. The tower was, however, the tallest free-standing structure in the city from 1714 until 1888. The building's clock tower was destroyed on October 14, 1802 by an earthquake. In 1888, the building was demolished.
 B.  This building was destroyed by an earthquake on November 10, 1940.

References
 General
 
 Specific

External links
 Diagram of Bucharest skyscrapers on SkyscraperPage
 Bucharest structures on Structurae

Bucharest
Tallest